Tamsyn Carolyn Lewis (born 20 July 1978) is an Australian media personality and former track and field athlete who won a total of eighteen Australian Championships across the 400 metres, 800 metres and 400m hurdles. She first represented Australia in 1994, and won the 800 metres in the 2008 World Indoor Championships.

Personal life

Lewis was born and raised in Melbourne, Victoria and attended Methodist Ladies' College and Caulfield Grammar School. Her mother Carolyn Wright was a six-time national high jump champion, while her father, Greg Lewis, was a semi-finalist in the 200 metres at the Summer 1968 Olympics. She married Australian cricketer Graham Manou in 2011.

Athletics career

Lewis emerged onto the national athletics scene in 1994, winning several events at the Australian Championships: the Under-16 100 m/200 m double and the Under-20 400 m. After these performances she was chosen, aged 15, for the 1994 Commonwealth Games as a 4 x 400 metres relay runner, though she did not eventually compete in the event. Her next international selection was for the 1996 World Junior Championships in Sydney, where she won a bronze medal as part of the Australian 4 x 400 metres relay team.

In 1998, Lewis moved up to the 800 metres, winning the National Championship and gaining a place in the 1998 Commonwealth Games team. Though she did not win a medal in the 800 metres, she contributed to Australia's gold medal winning 4 × 400 metres relay team. She next ran internationally in the 800 metres and 4 x 400 metres relay at the 1999 World Indoor Championships in Maebashi, where she set an Australian indoor record of 2:02.42 in her individual event and again won a medal as part of Australia's 4 x 400 metres relay team.

Leading up to the 2000 Sydney Summer Olympics, Lewis set new personal bests in the 400 and 800 metres to qualify for the Australian team. At the Olympics, she missed the Olympic final in the 800 metres by less than a tenth of a second, but ran in Australia's 4 x 400 metres relay team which set two national records.

In the following years, Lewis did not improve her personal best performances and gained a reputation as an underachiever in international competitions. She stopped running the 800 metres in 2005 to focus on the 400 metres and develop her speed. She competed only in the 400 metres at the 2006 Commonwealth Games, where she missed making the final, and in the 4 x 400 metres relay event, where she won her third successive gold medal amidst a major controversy, as part of the victorious Australian quartet.

In 2007 Lewis made a return to the 800 metres under new coach, and brother, Justin Lewis, winning the national championships, placing in several European Meetings and qualifying for the 2007 World Championships, where she finished fourth in her heat in 2:01.21 and again missed the final.

Lewis enjoyed a return to her best form in early 2008, remaining undefeated over 400 metres and 800 metres in Australia. She ran a personal best time of 51.44 to win the national 400 metres titles and comfortably retained her 800 metres crown. These performances earned Lewis selection in her third consecutive Australian Olympic team.

At the 2008 World Indoor Championships, held in Valencia, Spain, Lewis qualified for the final by running an Australian record of 2:01.85 in her heat. In a tactical final, Lewis broke away from perennial champion Maria de Lurdes Mutola and Ukrainian Tetiana Petlyuk to win the gold medal in a major upset. Lewis said "I was wondering what I was doing out there. Then I realised that I could win the race. This is amazing. I still can't believe it."

Lewis represented Australia at the 2008 Olympics in Beijing. Here she made the semi-final of the 800 metres and narrowly missed qualifying for the semi-final of the 400 metres.

At the 2009 Australian Championships, Lewis won both the 400 metres and the 400m hurdles.

Over her athletics career, Lewis won a total of 18 national titles, and her coaches included Peter Fortune (Cathy Freeman's coach), Sebastian Coe and Daley Thompson.

Relay teams

Lewis won a number of international medals in the 4 × 400 m relay:

 At the 1996 World Junior Championships in Sydney, Lewis, Rosemary Hayward, Josephine Fowley and Jennifer Marshall won a bronze medal, recording a time of 3:32.47.
 At the 1999 World Indoor Championships in Maebashi, Lewis combined with Susan Andrews, Tania Van-Heer and Cathy Freeman to win a silver medal in an Australian record of 3:26.87.
Lewis is also a three-time gold medal winner in the Commonwealth Games 4 × 400 m relay event.
 At Kuala Lumpur 1998,  Lewis joined Lee Naylor, Tania Van-Heer and Susan Andrews to win in a time of 3:27.28.
 At Manchester 2002, Lewis ran the third leg in a team which featured Olympic 400 metres champion Cathy Freeman, Lauren Hewitt and, anchoring, 400m hurdles champion Jana Pittman. Lewis leg saw Australia move from second into first place, and their time was a Games record 3:25.63.
 At Melbourne 2006, Lewis and her teammates Pittman, Caitlin Willis and Rosemary Hayward were second across the line being beaten by England; again Lewis had run the third leg. After consultation with her fellow runners, both Lewis and Pittman informed officials of a rule breach by England's Natasha Danvers (IAAF Rule 170 – Item 9), which the officials had already noted. England was subsequently disqualified and Australia awarded the gold medal; the time 3:28.66. Afterwards, Australian track legend Ron Clarke called on the Australian team to return their gold medal.

Media career

Lewis began her media career with Melbourne radio station Triple M, as part of the 'Dead Set Legends' crew, in 2005.

In 2006, she appeared on the Australian television series Dancing with the Stars. Partnered by Arsen Kishishian, Lewis finished third.

From December 2007, with Jules Lund and Ryan Shelton, Lewis presented the Summer Fling breakfast show across the Austereo Today Network.

Lewis and Bruce McAvaney presented the athletics track events for the Seven Network at the 2016 Summer Olympics in Rio de Janeiro and at the 2021 Summer Olympics in Tokyo.

Controversies

In 2004, Lewis posed in bikinis for Ralph magazine, prompting criticism from the media for losing focus on her preparation for the Athens Olympics. After Lewis failed to progress past the heats of her individual event, the 800 metres, she and her coaches defended the photoshoot saying it was undertaken in five hours on one day and was not to blame for her result.

In February 2006, Lewis and fellow Australian runner Jana Pittman were involved in a public feud after the Australian athletics trials for the 2006 Commonwealth Games. Pittman, in answer to a media question following her heat win, had stated she had "no competition" in Australia; Lewis responded "I was standing behind the blocks [for the final] going, 'I'll give you no competition, bitch.'" in a radio interview after she won the final with Pittman finishing last. The media later described their relationship as a "catfight" and a "bitchfight."

In the 29 May 2006 edition of Australian "Zoo Weekly" magazine, Lewis again posed in what Nova 100 afternoon DJ's described as "incredibly racy" lingerie. In the accompanying article, Lewis went into detail about her relationship with Jana Pittman and the furore caused over comments by Pittman that the team should all return their medals.

In the lead-up to the Beijing Olympics she stated she would be running against drug cheats: "I have no doubts that when I line up next week, I will look left and right and know the other girls aren't all clean".

Statistics

Personal bests

Australian Championships titles

Yearly progression

See also
 List of Caulfield Grammar School people

References

External links
 IAAF profile for Tamsyn Manou
 
 Tamsyn Lewis – personal website

1978 births
Olympic athletes of Australia
Australian female sprinters
Commonwealth Games gold medallists for Australia
Australian female middle-distance runners
Athletes (track and field) at the 2000 Summer Olympics
Athletes (track and field) at the 2004 Summer Olympics
Athletes (track and field) at the 2008 Summer Olympics
Athletes (track and field) at the 2006 Commonwealth Games
Athletes (track and field) at the 2002 Commonwealth Games
Athletes (track and field) at the 1998 Commonwealth Games
Athletes (track and field) at the 1994 Commonwealth Games
Sportswomen from Victoria (Australia)
People educated at Caulfield Grammar School
Living people
World Athletics Championships athletes for Australia
Athletes from Melbourne
Commonwealth Games medallists in athletics
World Athletics Indoor Championships winners
World Athletics Indoor Championships medalists
Medallists at the 1998 Commonwealth Games
Medallists at the 2002 Commonwealth Games
Medallists at the 2006 Commonwealth Games